The eighth season of The Real Housewives of Beverly Hills, an American reality television show, aired on Bravo from December 19, 2017 to May 15, 2018, and is primarily filmed in Beverly Hills, California.

The season focuses on the personal and professional lives of Kyle Richards, Lisa Vanderpump, Lisa Rinna, Erika Girardi, Dorit Kemsley and Teddi Mellencamp.

The seasons executive producers are Andrew Hoegl, Barrie Bernstein, Lisa Shannon, Pam Healy and Andy Cohen.

Production and crew
Alex Baskin, Chris Cullen, Douglas Ross, Greg Stewart, Toni Gallagher, Dave Rupel and Andy Cohen are recognized as the series' executive producers; it is produced and distributed by Evolution Media.

Cast
The eighth season came with the addition of Teddi Mellencamp Arroyave. Grammer returned in a friend of capacity, while Davidson, Resnick and Maloof appeared as guests.

 Grammer sits on the end of the left couch, next to Rinna, during her appearance at the reunion.

Episodes

References

External links

 
 
 

2017 American television seasons
2018 American television seasons
Beverly Hills (season 8)